Coleophora elephantacolorella is a moth of the family Coleophoridae. It is found in Afghanistan.

Taxonomy
Coleophora elephantacolorella is the replacement name for Coleophora decipiens.

References

elephantacolorella
Moths described in 1971
Moths of Asia